Plank Lane railway station served the hamlet of Crankwood and the Plank Lane area of Leigh, England. Like many railways, the line passed between rather than through communities, with branches off to serve the key driver - goods, and in this area - coal.

Location and nearby stations
The station was the only one on the Plank Lane Branch, which ran from junctions with the Eccles, Tyldesley and Wigan line south to Pennington. It was situated immediately north of the bridge over Crankwood Lane, which in 2015 was still a minor road. 
Throughout this station's short life the GCR operated West Leigh and Bedford station a short distance to the west on the same country lane but on a different line.

Opening and closure
The station opened in 1903 and closed in 1915, never to reopen. The line survived until well after WW2 but has since been lifted and in many places obliterated.

References

Sources

External links
The station site on a 1948 OS Map npe Maps
The line and mileages Railway Codes
The station on an Edwardian OS Map National Library of Scotland
The station and local lines on various maps Rail Map Online

Disused railway stations in the Metropolitan Borough of Wigan
Former London and North Western Railway stations
Railway stations in Great Britain opened in 1903
Railway stations in Great Britain closed in 1915